New Men is the ninth extended play by South Korean boy group BTOB. The EP was released by Cube Entertainment on November 7, 2016 and contains 7 tracks including the lead single "Pray (I'll Be Your Man)".

Background and release
After consecutively releasing ballad songs, BTOB was revealed to release a dance title track after 2 years and 2 months since "You're so Fly" in 2014.

On November 7, BTOB released their ninth EP New Men with the title track, "I'll Be Your Man" (기도). "I'll Be Your Man" is described as an emotional dance track with trap elements that talks about not being able to forget a past love and praying to be with her again. It was written and composed by member Im Hyun-sik. A music video for the title track was released on the same day, featuring CLC's Elkie.

Track listing

References

External links

2016 EPs
BtoB (band) EPs
Cube Entertainment EPs
Korean-language EPs